The 2003 IIHF World U18 Championship Division III was a pair of international under-18 ice hockey tournaments run by the International Ice Hockey Federation. The Division III tournaments made up the fourth level of competition at the 2003 IIHF World U18 Championships. The Group A tournament took place between 5 and 8 March 2003 in Mexico City, Mexico and the Group B tournament took place between 6 and 9 February 2003 in Sarajevo, Bosnia and Herzegovina. The Group A competition was won by Australia while Iceland won the Group B tournament. Upon winning their respective tournaments both teams gained promotion to Division II of the 2004 IIHF World U18 Championships.

Group A tournament
The Group A tournament began on 5 March 2003 in Mexico City, Mexico. All four teams participating made their debuts at the IIHF World U18 Championships. Australia won the tournament after winning all three of their games and gained promotion to Division II of the 2004 IIHF World U18 Championships. Mexico finished second after losing only to Australia and China finished third after losing to Australia and Mexico. New Zealand who finished last also suffered the largest defeat of the tournament, losing to Australia 1–14. Lliam Webster of Australia finished as the top scorer of the tournament with nine points including five goals and four assists. Australia's Patrick Baxter finished the tournament as the leading goaltender based on save percentage.

Standings

Fixtures
All times local.

Scoring leaders

List shows the top ten skaters sorted by points, then goals.

Leading goaltenders
Only the top goaltenders, based on save percentage, who have played 40% of their team's minutes are included in this list.

Group B tournament
The Group B tournament began on 6 February 2003 in Sarajevo, Bosnia and Herzegovina. Turkey who finished last in Division III at the 2002 IIHF World U18 Championships returned to compete in this year's Division III tournament, Israel returned to the World Championships having not played since 2001, Iceland made their first appearance in the Division having only previously played in a qualification tournament in 2001, and Bosnia and Herzegovina made their debut appearance at the World Championships. Iceland won the tournament after winning all three of their games and gained promotion to Division II of the 2004 IIHF World U18 Championships. Turkey finished second after beating both Bosnia and Herzegovina and Israel on goal difference and Bosnia and Herzegovina finished in third. Israel who had original won their first two games against Iceland and Bosnia and Herzegovina had the results annulled and scored 5–0 in favour of the opposing teams due to their use of three players who did not meet the International Ice Hockey Federation's eligibility criteria. Israel had originally won the games 9–1 against Bosnia and Herzegovina and 5–4 against Iceland. Birgir Jakob Hansen of Iceland finished as the top scorer of the tournament with ten points including five goals and five assists.

Standings

Fixtures
All times local.

Scoring leaders
List shows the top ten skaters sorted by points, then goals.

References

2002–03 in Mexican ice hockey
III
Ice hockey competitions in Bosnia and Herzegovina
International ice hockey competitions hosted by Mexico
2003
February 2003 sports events
March 2003 sports events
Sports competitions in Mexico City
2003 IIHF World U18 Championship Division III
2003 IIHF World U18 Championship Division III
Sports competitions in Sarajevo
2002–03 in Bosnia and Herzegovina ice hockey